The Questions of Bartholomew is not to be confused with the book called Resurrection of Jesus Christ, although either text may be the missing Gospel of Bartholomew (or neither may be), a lost work from the New Testament apocrypha.

History
The text survives as Greek, Latin, and Old Church Slavonic manuscripts, although each copy varies from the others considerably in the wording chosen. It is of similar style to the Apocalypse of St. John the Divine, although sensational instead of seeking to frighten. It is framed as a dialogue from Jesus to the apostles (it varies significantly as to at which stage in time between the manuscripts), instigated by a series of extremely daring and outrageous questions and requests by Bartholomew.

The text appears to have been quite popular, judging by how well it survived, perhaps due to depictions of the supernatural. For example, the text implies that The Fall of Man was caused by Satan poisoning the water of Eden.

The text draws heavily on Jewish mysticism (such as the Book of Enoch), seeking to provide an explanation of the more supernatural aspects of Christian thought at the time. However, rather than a more clinical treatment that would be expected for such a treatise, it approaches these topics in a tabloid manner, evidently seeking to be a popular work rather than one for official church teaching.

Narrative
Initially, the text describes how Jesus descended into hell in his own words, and then jumps to discussing the virginal conception when Mary arrives amongst the apostles. Next, the apostles ask for a vision of hell, and angels roll up the earth to let them, and then return the earth when they have glimpsed it.

Satan's Testimony
Finally, Bartholomew asks to see Satan, and so a choir of angels drags Beliar (a name for Satan) from the depths of hell in chains, the sight of which kills the apostles dead. Jesus immediately brings them back to life and gives Bartholomew control over Satan. Bartholomew asks Satan how he came to be the enemy and other questions on esoteric subjects such as the hierarchy of the angels. He also explains the story of his removal from heaven. Satan's testimony also includes an admission to his role as the leader of six hundred fallen angels that fell with him.

Salpsan
The work is unique for the detail of introducing a direct son to Satan, named Salpsan. He is notably absent from the Latin version, appearing only in the Greek text.

And I [Satan] looked about and saw the six hundred who were under me senseless. And I awakened my son Salpsan and took him to counsel how I might deceive the man on whose account I was cast out of the heavens.

Satan and his son here have been interpreted as a counterpart to the Father and Son in Christianity. Although Salpsan was previously considered a possible reference to the Antichrist, authors have linked him instead to the Enochian tradition of the Watchers and their monstrous offspring. He is also compared to Cain in accounts where the latter is sired by the fallen angel Samael after seducing Eve.

See also
 Decretum Gelasianum
 Gospel of Bartholomew
 Iblis
 New Testament apocrypha

References

External links
Online text of the Questions of Bartholomew

Bartholomew, Questions of
Satan